Vandal may refer to the following ships:

 , British submarine launched in 1942 and lost in 1943
 , Russian diesel-powered tanker launched in 1903

Ship names